Fort Kochi Graffiti is the Banksy-styled graffiti to protest against the Kochi-Muziris Biennale by an unknown artist in the street and walls in Fort Kochi. This satirical street art and subversive epigrams combine dark humour with graffiti executed in a stencilling technique. It is creating a flutter in social networking sites the world over.

Bob Marley, Jimi Hendrix and Michael Jackson as the Carnatic Trinity playing the Veena and the Tanpura; Colonel Sanders the founder of KFC(Kentucky Fried Chicken) flipping Kerala Parottas; Karl Marx and Frederick Engels meditating on tiger skin; Old Malayalam film actor Prem Nazir as James Bond; the lady in the famous painting Mona Lisa as a delicate pot bearing village belle; the cartoon characters in Mayavi.

Sources

Kochi-Muziris Biennale
Graffiti in India